Cercidocerus securifer is a species of the family Curculionidae.

References 

 Bisby F.A., Roskov Y.R., Orrell T.M., Nicolson D., Paglinawan L.E., Bailly N., Kirk P.M., Bourgoin T., Baillargeon G., Ouvrard D. (red.) (2011). Catalogue of Life
 Wtaxa
 Biolib

Dryophthorinae
Beetles described in 1893